168P/Hergenrother is a periodic comet in the Solar System. The comet originally named P/1998 W2 returned in 2005 and got the temporary name P/2005 N2. The comet was last observed in January 2020, and may have continued fragmenting after the 2012 outburst.

2012 outburst 
The comet came to perihelion on October 1, 2012, and was expected to reach about apparent magnitude 15.2, but due to an outburst the comet reached apparent magnitude 8. As a result of the outburst of gas and dust, the comet was briefly more than 500 times brighter than it would have been without the outburst. On October 19, 2012, images by the Virtual Telescope Project showed a dust cloud trailing the nucleus. Images by the  Faulkes Telescope North on October 26, 2012, confirm a fragmentation event. The secondary fragment was about magnitude 17. Further observations by the  Gemini telescope show that the comet fragmented into at least four parts.

2019 
168P came to perihelion on August 5, 2019, when it was 76 degrees from the Sun. It was not recovered until January 3, 2020, when it was 141 degrees from the Sun, but only two observations on a single night were reported.

References

External links 
 168P on Seiichi Yoshida's comet list
 Elements and Ephemeris for 168P/Hergenrother – Minor Planet Center
 168P at Kronk's Cometography
 Comet 168P Hergenrother in outburst (Google+ chat archive Oct 12, 2012)
 Comet Hergenrother in Outburst (Carl Hergenrother : 20 Oct 2012)
 Comet 168P and fragment as seen by Kitt Peak WIYN  on 30 Oct 2012
 Scientists Monitor Comet Breakup (168P-Hergenrother was imaged by the NOAO/Gemini telescope Nov. 2, 2012)
 Temporal Correlation Between Outbursts and Fragmentation Events of Comet 168P/Hergenrother (arXiv:1409.7641 : 26 Sep 2014)

Periodic comets
0168
Comets in 2019
Split comets